Sabine Appelmans was the defending champion but did not compete that year.

Gloria Pizzichini won in the final 6–0, 6–2 against Silvija Talaja.

Seeds
A champion seed is indicated in bold text while text in italics indicates the round in which that seed was eliminated.

  Iva Majoli (second round)
  Joannette Kruger (quarterfinals)
 n/a
  Alexandra Fusai (first round)
  Radka Zrubáková (second round)
  Veronika Martinek (second round)
  Janette Husárová (second round)
  Paola Suárez (quarterfinals)
  Henrieta Nagyová (first round)

Draw

External links
 1996 "M" Electronika Cup Draw

Croatian Bol Ladies Open
1996 WTA Tour